District School Board of Levy County or the School Board of Levy County (SBLC) is a school district headquartered in Bronson, Florida. It serves Levy County. Chris Cowart serves as Superintendent.

Schools
K-12:
 Cedar Key School
6-12:
 Bronson Middle High School
 Chiefland Middle High School
 Williston Middle High School
PK-8:
 Yankeetown School
 Whispering Winds Charter School (Chiefland)
6-8:
 Nature Coast Middle School (Chiefland)
PK-5:
 Bronson Elementary School
 Chiefland Elementary School
3-5:
 Williston Elementary School
PK-2:
 Joyce M. Bullock Elementary School (Williston)

References

External links
 School Board of Levy County

Levy
Education in Levy County, Florida